Livoberezhnyi or livoberezhna (masculine and feminine, ; literally: "left-bank") may refer to one of the following:

Geography
 Livoberezhnyi Masyv, a neighbourhood of Kyiv, Ukraine
 Livoberezhnyi neighborhood, Dnipro, a neighbourhood (masyv) of Dnipro, Ukraine
 Left-bank Ukraine, a historic name of the part of Ukraine on the left (East) bank of the Dnieper River

Transport
 Livoberezhna (Kyiv Metro), a station on the Kyiv Metro
 Livoberezhna line (Kyiv Metro), a proposed rapid transit line of the Kyiv Metro
 Livoberezhna line (Kyiv Light Rail), a rapid transit line of the Kyiv Light Rail